Calchfynydd (Welsh calch "lime" + mynydd "mountain") was an obscure Britonnic kingdom or sub-kingdom of sub-Roman Britain. Its exact location is unknown and virtually nothing certain is known about it.

The name survives in the epithet of Cadrawd Calchfynydd, apparently a 6th-century ruler of the district. Welsh sources refer to Cadrawd as one of the Gwyr y Gogledd or 'Men of the North', suggesting the area was located somewhere in northern Britain. William Forbes Skene suggested an identification with Kelso (formerly Calchow) in southern Scotland and Rachel Bromwich agrees that a location somewhere in the Hen Ogledd is most likely. Alistair Moffat in his history of Kelso supports this position, citing early references to "Chalchou," as well as the chalk area and Chalkheugh Terrace.  John Morris placed it south of the realm of Urien of Rheged.  Hills of lime or chalk might refer to the Cotswolds or Chilterns.

Presumed rulers in the line of Cadrawd
Cynwyd Cynwydion
Cadrawd Calchfynydd
Yspwys Mwyntyrch
Mynan

References

British traditional history
Former monarchies of Europe
History of the Scottish Borders
Sub-Roman Britain
Hen Ogledd